An annular solar eclipse occurred on August 10, 1915. A solar eclipse occurs when the Moon passes between Earth and the Sun, thereby totally or partly obscuring the image of the Sun for a viewer on Earth. An annular solar eclipse occurs when the Moon's apparent diameter is smaller than the Sun's, blocking most of the Sun's light and causing the Sun to look like an annulus (ring). An annular eclipse appears as a partial eclipse over a region of the Earth thousands of kilometres wide. Annularity was visible from the Pacific Ocean, with the only land being Haha-jima Group in Japan, where the eclipse occurred on August 11 because it is west of International Date Line.

Related eclipses

Solar eclipse 1913–1917

Saros 134

Tritos series

Notes

References 

1915 in science
1915 8 10
1915 8 10
August 1915 events